The International Material Data System (IMDS) is a global data repository that contains information on materials used by the automotive industry. Several leading auto manufacturers use the IMDS to maintain data for various reporting requirements.

In the IMDS, all materials present in finished automobile manufacturing are collected, maintained, analysed and archived. IMDS facilitates meeting the obligations placed on automobile manufacturers, and thus on their suppliers, by national and international standards, laws and regulations.

Introduction
The IMDS was originally a collaboration of Audi, BMW, Daimler, EDS (now part of DXC Technology, the system administrator), Ford, Opel, Porsche, VW and Volvo. Since inception the list of participating vehicle manufacturers and suppliers has grown greatly.

Usage
Because it is a computer-based system, IMDS highlights hazardous and controlled substances by comparing entered data with regulatory-originated lists of prohibited substances (GADSL, REACH, ELV, etc...). Hence OEMs can trace hazardous substances back to the individual part and work with suppliers to reduce, control, or eliminate the hazard.

All substances must be declared in the material data sheet (MDS) of the IMDS to a resolution of 1 gram or better – not just declarable and prohibited substances (e.g. Cr VI / Hg / Pb / Cd). Substances and materials of products must be known in detail so that it may be delivered by the OEMs to dismantler companies in order to achieve the goals of the ELV Directive.

The basic workflow model of the system is for each supplier to submit data about the parts they sell to their direct customer.   When each link in the supply chain submits data per this method, it mimics actual supply chain part flow, preserving customer-to-supplier relations.  Data entry in IMDS is frequently a contractual requirement of PPAP which is one part of standard automotive quality systems.

Access and costs
The IMDS is easily accessed through the internet.  The basic web browser version of the system is supported by the OEM sponsor's group and provided free of charge to suppliers in the automotive supply chain.

There are several vendors that provide systems allowing compatible IMDS interaction with Product lifecycle management, download and upload, data format translation, and other reporting systems.

Changes in 2013 and 2014
 2013 – IMDS NT for Design Changes
 2014 – IMDS 2020 for New Functions

References

External links

Training Homepage for new IMDS NT Design
GADSL Homepage
End of Life Vehicles Directive 2000/53/EC
REACh
IMDS at AIAG
IMDS Suppliers Group at CLEPA, European Automotive Suppliers' Association
US American Automotive Suppliers' Associations
About IMDS (Brazil)

Automotive standards
Material handling
Automotive industry
European Union directives
Vehicle recycling